The 1949–50 season was Fussball Club Basel 1893's 56th season in their existence. It was their fourth season in the top flight of Swiss football following their promotion from the Nationalliga B after the season 1945–46. This season Basel played their home games in the Stadion Schützenmatte in the Bachletten quartier in the southwestern edge of the city of Basel. Jules Düblin was the club's chairman for the fourth successive season.

Overview 
Ernst Hufschmid, who had functioned as player-coach the previous two seasons, continued in this function this season. Basel played a total of 41 games in this season. Of these 26 in the Nationalliga A, five in the Swiss Cup and ten were test games. The test games resulted with three victories and seven defeats. In total, including the test games and the cup competition, they won 21 games, drew five and lost 15 times. In the 41 games they scored 78 goals and conceded 75.

There were fourteen teams contesting in the 1949–50 Nationalliga A, the bottom two teams in the table to be relegated. Basel started the season well, winning six of the first seven games and things continued well. Basel stayed in contention of the championship. But at the end of the season they lost their last two games and finished in second position, two points behind the new champions Servette who won their last two games. Basel won 14 games, drew five and were defeated seven times, they scored 48 goals as they gained their 33 points. Gottlieb Stäuble with 13 goals was the team's best scorer and 8th best league scorer. René Bader was the team's second best goal getter, netting nine times, Paul Stöcklin netted six times.

Basel started in the 3rd round of the Swiss Cup with an away match against lower tier FC Porrentruy. This was won. In round 4 Basel were drawn away against Grasshopper Club and this too was won. In the round of 16 and the quarter-final Basel played at home and won against Wil and Bellinzona respectively. However Lausanne-Sport won the semi-final and continued to the final and they won the trophy.

Players 
The following is the list of the Basel first team squad during the season 1949–50. The list includes players that were in the squad on the day that the Nationalliga A season started on 28 August 1949 but subsequently left the club after that date.

 
 

 
 

 

 
 

Players who left the squad

Results

Legend

Friendly matches

Pre-season

Mid- to end of season

Nationalliga

League matches

League standings

Swiss Cup

See also
 History of FC Basel
 List of FC Basel players
 List of FC Basel seasons

References

Sources 
 Rotblau: Jahrbuch Saison 2014/2015. Publisher: FC Basel Marketing AG. 
 Die ersten 125 Jahre. Publisher: Josef Zindel im Friedrich Reinhardt Verlag, Basel. 
 The FCB team 1949–50 at fcb-archiv.ch
 Switzerland 1949–50 by Erik Garin at Rec.Sport.Soccer Statistics Foundation

External links
 FC Basel official site

FC Basel seasons
Basel